WZXI (1280 AM) is a radio station  broadcasting an talk format. Licensed to Lancaster, Kentucky, United States, the station is owned by David Greenly, through licensee Eastern Sky LLC.

References

External links

ZXI
Lancaster, Kentucky
1966 establishments in Kentucky
Radio stations established in 1966